It All Comes Down to This may refer to:

 It All Comes Down to This (album), a 1999 hardcore punk record by Bane
 It All Comes Down to This (mixtape), a 2010 hip hop record by Remedy